Mohammad Firouzi (born 1958 in Tehran) is a prolific Iranian musician, whose primary instrument is the barbat.

References

1958 births
Living people
20th-century Iranian musicians
Place of birth missing (living people)
Date of birth missing (living people)